Ann Rosensweig Klein (1923–1986) was an American politician who served as a representative in the New Jersey General Assembly.

Education 
Klein received an undergraduate degree from Barnard College and graduated from the Columbia University School of Social Work.

Career 
She was president of the New Jersey League of Women Voters, from 1967 until 1971. She left that position when she ran for the New Jersey General Assembly. A resident of Morristown, she was elected in 1971 to represent District 10B in the New Jersey General Assembly  (one of two districts in Morris County), thereby becoming the first Democrat to represent the county in 60 years. While in the Assembly, she supported a bill which removed the requirement that women must disclose their marital status when registering to vote.

In 1973 she began her bid for Governor of New Jersey. After she placed second to Brendan Byrne, he nominated her as commissioner of the Department of Institutions and Agencies, and she was approved by the New Jersey State Senate. While serving in as commissioner she worked to find places for people released from state hospitals in New Jersey, and advocated for better treatment of mental health care patients.

In 1981 she tried again for the Democratic candidate for governor of New Jersey but was unsuccessful.

Personal life
Klein had two children with her husband. They divorced in 1980. Klein died in 1986.

Awards and honors 
The Ann Klein Forensic Center at Trenton Psychiatric Hospital was named in honor of Klein to recognize her work in New Jersey. In 1988, the Community Health Law Project began awarding the Ann Klein Advocate Award.

References

1923 births
1986 deaths
Barnard College alumni
Columbia University School of Social Work alumni
Democratic Party members of the New Jersey General Assembly
People from Morristown, New Jersey
Women state legislators in New Jersey
20th-century American politicians
20th-century American women politicians
Jewish women